Humberto Calderón Berti (born 21 October 1941 in Boconó, Venezuela) is a Venezuelan geologist, petroleum engineer, diplomat, politician and author, named in 2019 as ambassador to Colombia by interim Venezuelan president Juan Guaido during the 2019 Venezuelan presidential crisis, and welcomed by Carlos Holmes Trujillo, Colombia's foreign minister.

Career 
Calderón Berti is a former president of PDVSA (Venezuela's state-owned petroleum company), and the country's former Minister of Energy and Mines, as well as former Minister of Foreign Affairs. He is also a former OPEC president. His undergraduate degree was from the Central University of Venezuela, and he has a Master's in petroleum engineering from the University of Tulsa in Tulsa, Oklahoma.

In 2003, he and other former PDVSA petroleum executives founded the Colombian company, Vetra Energia, S.L. He solicited and was granted Spanish citizenship, where he has family and cultural ties, in 2018 because of persecution due to his membership in Venezuela's Social Christian political party (Copei).

On 26 November, Guaidó dismissed Calderón as ambassador in Colombia, citing plans to change foreign policy. Venezuelan diplomat Diego Arria condemned the dismissal, calling it a "huge mistake".

Publications

His publications include:
 Hacia una Política Petrolera Integral: la Responsabilidad Nacional, el Compromiso Internacional  (1979)
 La Coyuntura Petrolera Venezolana 1982  (1982)
 Venezuela y Su Política Petrolera, 1979–1983  (1986) 
  La Invasión a Kuwait  (1991)

References

External links
 Bloomberg profile

1941 births
Living people
People from Trujillo (state)
Central University of Venezuela alumni
Copei politicians
OPEC people
University of Tulsa alumni
People of the Crisis in Venezuela
Venezuelan geologists
20th-century Venezuelan engineers
Petroleum engineers
20th-century geologists
Venezuelan Ministers of Foreign Affairs
Venezuelan presidential crisis
Presidents of PDVSA
Energy ministers of Venezuela
Ambassadors of Venezuela to Colombia